The  International Journal of Molecular Sciences is a peer-reviewed open access scientific journal covering research in chemistry, molecular physics, and molecular biology. It is published by MDPI and was established in 2000. The editor-in-chief is Maurizio Battino (Marche Polytechnic University).

Abstracting and indexing
The journal is abstracted and indexed in:

According to the Journal Citation Reports, the journal has a 2021 impact factor of 6.208.

References

External links

Biochemistry journals
Open access journals
MDPI academic journals
English-language journals
Monthly journals
Publications established in 2000